, also known as George Manabe, is a Japanese manga artist.

He is best known in the English-speaking world for Caravan Kidd, Outlanders, and Capricorn.

He is not to be confused with an animator of the same name (but written differently; 真鍋譲二) who worked mainly in the 1970s for Oh! Production, contributing to such works as A Dog of Flanders, Genshi Shōnen Ryû, 3000 Leagues in Search of Mother, Dokonjō Gaeru, King Arthur, Galaxy Express 999, Lupin the 3rd: Season 1, Lupin the 3rd: The Castle of Cagliostro, Future Boy Conan (episodes 8–17), and others.

Works
Listed chronologically.

Outlanders (8 volumes, 1985–1987, Hakusensha)
Caravan Kidd (5 volumes, 1986–1989, Shogakukan)
The Key of Graciale (1 volume, April 1987, Hakusensha)
Powerful Mazegohan (3 volumes, 1986–1989, Hakusensha)
Dora (1 volume, December 1987, Shinshokan)
Capricorn (5 volumes, 1988–1990, Shinshokan)
Sorcerian: Ten no Kamigami-tachi (volume 6 in the Sorcerian manga series, September 1989, Kadokawa Shoten)
Banpanera (1 volume, February 1991, Fujimi Shobo)
Junk Party (1 volume, November 1991, Kadokawa Shoten)
Russian Clash (1 volume, April 1992, Fujimi Shobo)
Dotō! Jamuka no Daibōken (5 volumes, July 1992 – August 1994, Shinshokan)
Ginga Sengoku Gun'yūden Rai (27 volumes, September 1993 – December 2001, Media Works)
Ginga Sengoku Gun'yūden Rai: Ibun (1 volume, 10 April 2004, Media Works)
Viva Usagi-gozō (5 volumes, November 1993 – December 1995, Gakken)
Chūka Ichiban (1 volume, December 1993, Kadokawa Shoten)
Gosei Dōji Ran (2 volumes, August 1995 – September 1996, Kobunsha)
Drakuun: Dragon Princess Army (5 volumes, 1995–2003, Kadokawa Shoten)
Budō Shōsa Powerful China (1 volume, December 1996, Tokuma Shoten)
Wild Kingdom (5 volumes, December 2000 – February 2003, Enterbrain)
Kurobone (1 volume, 10 October 2003, Media Works)
Ogin (1 volume, 17 March 2005, Ohzora Publishing)
Oniku ni Chu (1 volume, 17 August 2005, Takeshobo)
Makunouchi Deluxe (3 volumes, 8 May 2006 – October 2007, Takeshobo)
Tail Chaser (3 volumes, 25 August 2006 – 25 December 2007, Fujimi Shuppan)
 Ring × Mama (5 volumes, 27 August 2008 – 29 August 2011, Takeshobo,  /  /  /  / )
 Koisuru Ushi-chichi (2 volumes, 2009–2010, Fujimi Shuppan)
 Kanojo de Ippai (3 volumes, 2010–2012,  /  / , Houbunsha)
Johji Manabe Presents: Maina Kishin Sōki (1 volume, Gakken)

References

External links
  
 
 
 Johji Manabe manga works at Media Arts Database 

1964 births
Hentai creators
Japanese animators
Living people
Manga artists